"Living Again" is a song by Slovene duo Maraaya. This is their third single released on 19 September 2015 at Red Cross live charity concert in Cankar Hall, Ljubljana.

Credits and personnel 

Raay – music, producer
Marjetka Vovk – lyrics, vocals
Niko Karo, Karo Media – director of video

Charts

Weekly charts

Year-end charts

Release history

References 

2015 songs
2015 singles